Keith Kasson Carlos (born December 19, 1987) is a former American football wide receiver and fashion model who became the first male winner of America's Next Top Model.

Early life
Carlos attended Central High School in Bridgeport, Connecticut.

College career

Lackawanna College
After high school, Carlos attended Lackawanna College.

Carlos committed to Purdue University on February 24, 2009. Carlos also received scholarships from three other FBS schools: Kansas State, Rutgers, and Temple. While at Purdue, Carlos was initiated into the Nu chapter of Kappa Alpha Psi fraternity.

Purdue
Carlos's play netted him a scholarship to continue his football career at Purdue University. He was named a starting wide receiver for four games through the season in 2009. In 2010, Carlos changed his position to running back for the Boilermakers, after an injury to Ralph Bolden. Carlos went on to finish third on the team in rushing yards (337) and touchdowns (2). Carlos graduated from Purdue with a bachelor's degree in business administration.

NFL career

Philadelphia Eagles
Carlos signed with the Philadelphia Eagles of the National Football League (NFL) in 2011.

New York Giants
On June 3, 2013, Carlos was signed by the New York Giants. On August 20, 2013, he was waived as injured by the Giants. On August 21, 2013, he cleared waivers and was placed on the Giants' injured reserve list. On August 27, 2013, he was waived with an injury settlement.

America’s Next Top Model
Before his early retirement from football, Carlos had done a small number of modeling jobs. In 2011, he was the Krave magazine "Krave Kover Winner." The following year, Carlos appeared in the "Made Love Lately" music video by Day26 and was named an “unforgettable face” in a 2013 edition of Essence magazine.

In 2014, Carlos auditioned for the twenty-first cycle of America's Next Top Model. On December 6, 2014, Carlos was named the first male winner of America's Next Top Model; his prizes comprised a contract with NEXT Model Management, a photo shoot for Nylon magazine, and a cash prize of $100,000.

Carlos played the love interest in the "Be Careful" music video by Cardi B.

References

External links
 Purdue Boilermakers Bio
 NEXT Model Management - Keith Carlos
 Karyzma Agency Client Profile

1987 births
Living people
American football wide receivers
Male models from Connecticut
Sportspeople from Bridgeport, Connecticut
Purdue Boilermakers football players
New York Giants players
America's Next Top Model winners
Lackawanna Falcons football players
Central High School (Connecticut) alumni